Contrarreloj ("Countdown" in English) is the second album of Enanitos Verdes. It was published in 1986. Contrareloj was the group's second effort but the first that was recorded for CBS (now Sony). Produced by Andrés Calamaro, the album is a collection of pop/rock songs. Popular tracks on the album include "La Muralla Verde," "Conciencia Contra Reloj," "Cada Vez Que Digo Adiós," and "Simulacro de Tensión." They are still covered by the band in their shows.

Track listing 

 La muralla verde [The Green Wall]
 Conciencia contrarreloj [Counterclockwise Awareness]
 Cada vez que digo adiós [Every Time I Say Goodbye]
 Tus viejas cartas [Your Old Letters]
 La luz del río [Light of the River]
 Simulacro de tensión [Tension Mock]
 Sólo dame otra  [Just Give Me Another Chance]
 Luchas de poder [Power Fights]
 Es una máquina [It's A Machine]
 Algo terminó mal [Something Ended Up Wrong]

References 

1986 albums
Enanitos Verdes albums